Vallathol Unnikrishnan is an Indian actor in Malayalam movies. He was equally good at handling comedy roles and character roles. He mainly acted in Malayalam and Tamil films during the 1970s and 1980s. He was also a theater artist.

Partial filmography
 Boeing Boeing (1985) as Priest
 Collector Malathy (1967)
 Velliyazhcha (1969)
 Missi (1976)
 Vazhivilakku (1976)
 Sreemad Bhagavadgeetha (1977)
 Jagadguru Aadisankaran (1977)
 Lisa (1978)
 Simhaasanam (1979)
 Anupallavi (1979)
 Naayaattu (1980)
 Love In Singapore (1980)
 Abhinayam (1981)
 Karimpoocha (1981)
 Chilanthivala (1982) as Shankar
 Ankam (1983)
 Samrambham(1983)
 NH 47 (1984)
 Njan Piranna Nattil (1985)
 Kurukkan Rajavayi (1987)
 Maasmaram (1997)
 Kakkakuyil (2001)
 Saudaamini (2003)
 Vettam (2004)
 Velicham (2012)

References

External links

Vallathol Unnikrishnan at MSI

Male actors from Kerala
Male actors in Malayalam cinema
Indian male film actors
Year of birth missing (living people)
Living people
20th-century Indian male actors
21st-century Indian male actors